Abgarm (also Romanized as Ābgarm; also known as Ābgarm-e Karvan) is a village in Karvan-e Sofla Rural District, Karvan District, Tiran and Karvan County, Isfahan Province, Iran. At the 2006 census, its population was 705, in 198 families.

References 

Populated places in Tiran and Karvan County